"Sabotage" is a song by American rap rock group Beastie Boys, released in January 1994 as the first single from their fourth studio album, Ill Communication (1994). The song features traditional rock instrumentation (Ad-Rock on guitar, MCA on bass, and Mike D on drums), turntable scratches, heavily distorted bass guitar riffs and lead vocals by Ad-Rock. A moderate commercial success, the song was notable as well for its video, directed by Spike Jonze and nominated in five categories at the 1994 MTV Music Video Awards.

In 2004, Rolling Stone magazine ranked "Sabotage" #475 on their list of the 500 Greatest Songs of All Time. In 2010, it was dropped to #480. In a 2021 updated list, Rolling Stone re-ranked the song at #245. In March 2005, Q magazine placed it at #46 in its list of the 100 Greatest Guitar Tracks, and was ranked #19 on VH1's 100 Greatest Songs of the 90s list. Pitchfork Media included the song at #39 on their Top 200 Tracks of the 90s list.

Background
The song was first conceived when MCA played the signature bass line one day in the studio and it immediately caught the band's attention. Both Ad-Rock and Mike D picked up their respective instruments and started building on it. According to Ad-Rock in the 2020 Beastie Boys Story documentary, the lyrics are a fictitious rant about how their producer "was the worst person ever and how he was always sabotaging us and holding us back."

Critical reception
Larry Flick from Billboard wrote, "Loud, aggressive, and probably likely to spur senseless acts of vandalism by teen wannabes, but showcases Beasties' devotion to punk and old-school rap–mostly the former. All that and a nice, compact, three-minute package perfect for radio play, with some modern rock outlets already aboard." Chuck Campbell from Knoxville News Sentinel said that on the song, "over-the-top rage and bossy noise are key elements in a hybrid of vitriolic rap and edgy rock."

Paste, NME, and American Songwriter all named "Sabotage" as the Beastie Boys' greatest song.

Music video
The accompanying music video for "Sabotage", directed by Spike Jonze and played extensively on MTV, is a homage to, and parody of, 1970s crime drama shows such as Hawaii Five-O, The Streets of San Francisco, S.W.A.T., Baretta, and Starsky and Hutch. The video is presented as the opening credits of a fictional 1970s-style police show called Sabotage, with the band members appearing as the show's protagonists. Each band member is introduced as a fictional actor, and the names of the characters are also given.

The characters appearing on the show are (in order of credits):
 Sir Stewart Wallace guest-starring as himself (played by MCA)
 Nathan Wind as Cochese (also played by MCA)
 Vic Colfari as Bobby, "The Rookie" (played by Ad-Rock)
 Alasondro Alegré as "The Chief" (played by Mike D)
 Fred Kelly as Bunny (played by DJ Hurricane)

The Beastie Boys Video Anthology featured a mock interview of the "cast" of Sabotage conducted by Jonze's then-wife Sofia Coppola. Additionally, in the DVD commentary for the 1996 film Trainspotting, Danny Boyle credits the film's opening credits to those used in "Sabotage."

Actress Amy Poehler reviewed the music video in 2018's Beastie Boys Book saying that "there would be no Anchorman, no Wes Anderson, no Lonely Island, and no channel called Adult Swim if this video did not exist".

Censorship
Some scenes had to be removed when the video was shown on MTV, including a knife fight sequence, a scene in which a man is thrown out of a car into a street, and one where another man is thrown off a bridge and is shown violently hitting the ground (although it is clearly visible that the bodies thrown are stunt dummies).

1994 MTV Video Music Awards
The video for "Sabotage" was nominated for Video of the Year, Best Group Video, Breakthrough Video, Best Direction in a Video, and Viewer's Choice at the 1994 MTV Video Music Awards. However, it lost all five categories it was nominated in, losing Video of the Year, Best Group Video and Viewer's Choice to Aerosmith's "Cryin'", and Breakthrough Video and Best Direction in a Video to R.E.M.'s "Everybody Hurts".

During R.E.M. lead singer Michael Stipe's acceptance speech for the Best Direction award, Beastie Boys member MCA bum-rushed the stage in his "Nathaniel Hornblower" disguise, interrupting Stipe to protest the shutout of "Sabotage" from every category it was nominated in.

At the 2009 MTV Video Music Awards, the "Sabotage" video won best video in the new category of "Best Video (That Should Have Won a Moonman)".

In popular culture
The music video for Sabotage directly influenced the iconic opening sequence of the 1996 film Trainspotting.
 Beavis and Butthead review the video with Beavis asking when the real Sabotage show is going to come out.
 The band Phish covered the song in their 1998 concerts at Hampton Coliseum, and it appears on the live album of those concerts, Hampton Comes Alive.
 During Saturday Night Lives 25th Anniversary Special in 1999, the band played the first fifteen seconds of the song before their performance was "sabotaged" by Elvis Costello, who in 1977 had done the same to one of his own songs on the show; the Beastie Boys then accompanied him on "Radio, Radio", the song performed during the original incident.
 In the 1999 Futurama episode "Hell Is Other Robots", the Beastie Boys perform several songs, including an a cappella version of the song.
 The song is included in the track list for the 2007 video games Guitar Hero III: Legends of Rock and Rock Band.
 The roller coaster X² at Six Flags Magic Mountain has an on-board soundtrack that features Sabotage, which can be heard from after the first drop until the final brake run.
 The song is heard early in J. J. Abrams' 2009 Star Trek film, played on a car stereo by an adolescent James T. Kirk. This is one of the few uses of licensed music in a Star Trek production. The song also plays a crucial part in the plot of the 2016 sequel Star Trek Beyond, in which it is used by Kirk and his officers to disrupt an alien attack on a Federation starbase.
 The song was covered by hardcore punk band Cancer Bats for their 2010 album Bears, Mayors, Scraps & Bones.
 The song is included on the soundtrack of the 2012 film This Means War.
 In 2013, the song was heavily played and used in the soundtrack of one episode of How I Met Your Mother.
 Finnish band Steve 'N' Seagulls performed a version of the song in November 2015 for The A.V. Club A.V. Undercover series.
 The song played during the Bronco chase scene in The People v. O.J. Simpson: American Crime Story.
 The animated TV comedy series Family Guy used "Sabotage" in the 2016 episode "The New Adventures of Old Tom" for Peter and Tom Tucker's skateboarding video.
 The song is featured in the live-action trailer "New Heroes Will Rise" for the 2017 video game Destiny 2.
 Bubs is shown dressed as Nathan Wind as Cochese in the Homestar Runner 2014 Halloween special, "I Killed Pom Pom".
The song is featured in the official trailer for Illumination's Minions: The Rise of Gru.
The animated TV comedy series American Dad featured "Rabbitage" a leporine-themed parody song by "Weird Al" Yankovic in the 2020 episode "First, Do No Farm".
 The opening few seconds of the song is used in the movie "Red Notice" during the start of a would-be chase scene.
 The song is used in the starting lineup introductions and lead-up to tip-off at home games of the National Basketball League's Sydney Kings at Qudos Bank Arena since season 2021-22.
 The Seattle Kraken take the ice to the song prior to starting lineups as of the 2022-23 season.

Charts

Certifications

References

External links
Comprehensive info at BeastieMania

Beastie Boys songs
1994 singles
Music videos directed by Spike Jonze
Fictional television shows
Songs written by Ad-Rock
Songs written by Mike D
Songs written by Adam Yauch
Song recordings produced by Mario Caldato Jr.
1994 songs
American punk rock songs
American alternative rock songs